Muhammad Zeeshan Gurmani is a Pakistani politician who was a Member of the Provincial Assembly of the Punjab, from May 2013 to May 2018.

Early life
He was born in 1970.

Political career

He was elected to the Provincial Assembly of the Punjab as an independent candidate from Constituency PP-252 (Muzaffargarh-II) in 2013 Pakistani general election. He joined Pakistan Muslim League (N) in May 2013.

In April 2018, he announced to quit PML-N.

References

Living people
Punjab MPAs 2013–2018
1970 births
Pakistan Muslim League (N) politicians